Incredible may refer to:

Music

Albums
 Incredible (Clique Girlz album) or the title song, 2008
 Incredible (Gary Puckett & The Union Gap album), 1968
 Incredible (Ilse DeLange album), 2008
 Incredible (Mary Mary album) or the title song, 2002
 Incredible (Xia album) or the title song, 2013
 Incredible, by Scherrie Payne, 1987

Songs
 "Incredible" (Celine Dion and Ne-Yo song), 2013
 "Incredible" (Keith Murray song), 1998
 "Incredible" (M-Beat song), 1994
 "Incredible" (The Shapeshifters song), 2006
 "Incredible" (Timomatic song), 2012
 "Incredible (What I Meant to Say)", by Darius Campbell, 2003
 "Incredible", by Future from Hndrxx, 2017
 "Incredible", by J. Holiday from Guilty Conscience, 2014

Other uses
 INCredible, a record label
 Droid Incredible, a smartphone
 The Incredibles, a 2004 American computer-animated superhero film
 Aurore

See also
 
 
 The Incredibles (disambiguation)